Potting  may refer to: 

 Potting, in pottery, the making of pots, generally on the potter's wheel
 Potting (electronics), the encapsulation of electronic components
 In farming and gardening, potting is planting a plant in a pot, such as a flowerpot
 Sowing in greenhouses or polytunnels is often done in pots, pending later transplant
 Potting soil is a type of soil tailored to this use
 Potting on (or potting up) is the act of moving the plant, with its root ball, to a larger pot
 In a container garden, the plants remain potted throughout their lives
 In food preservation, potting is putting food (often meat) in pots with clarified butter (Food preservation § Jellying)
 Pot (cue sports), in cue sports, to sink a ball into a pocket

See also
 Pötting is a municipality in the Austrian state of Upper Austria